Kangersivartikajik, old spelling Kangerdluarssikajik, meaning "The bad little fjord," is a fjord in Eastern Greenland.

Geography
This fjord is located east of Sermilik (Sermiligaaq) in King Christian IX Land, north of Tasiilaq (Ammassalik). It runs from north to south for about 9 km. Sammileq (Sammilik) Fjord branches roughly northeastwards on the eastern side of its mouth. Leif Island is located to the south.

Bibliography
Spencer Apollonio, Lands That Hold One Spellbound: A Story of East Greenland, 2008

See also
List of fjords of Greenland

References

External links
Den grønlandske Lods - Geodatastyrelsen

Fjords of Greenland